Janice Hiromi Kawaye (born April 4, 1970) is an American voice actress known for her roles as Jenny Wakeman in My Life as a Teenage Robot, and Lysithea in the Fire Emblem series.

Early life
Kawaye was born in Los Angeles, California, U.S. to parents who are both of Japanese descent. She is fluent in Japanese.

Filmography

Animation

Anime

Films

Video games

Live action

References

Book references

External links
 
 
 

1970 births
Living people
Actresses from Los Angeles
American actresses of Japanese descent
American child actresses
American video game actresses
American voice actresses
Nickelodeon people
20th-century American actresses
21st-century American actresses